Santa Angela is a private Catholic school located at Jalan Merdeka 24 Bandung, West Java. It was founded by Dutch Ursuline nuns in 1905. It is listed as a local heritage site, preventing unauthorised changed to the building's structure. This status cancelled a planned renovation in 2019 to the west building. The school was originally exclusive for female students, but now it also accepts male students.  Although it's a private Catholic school, it also accepts non-catholic students. Over the years it has expanded to include 4 levels of education, stretching from Kindergarten, Elementary, Junior and Senior High School. The school's motto is "Servite et Amate", which roughly translates as "to serve".

Location
The school is located at Jalan Merdeka 24 Bandung, West Java. It was built adjacent to the Ursuline convent, which is a branch of the Ursuline convent at Jalan Supratman. The school is located in front of the DPRD building. Located near the school are the Polrestabes Bandung (Bandung Provincial Police Station) and Katedral St.Petrus (St.Peter's Cathedral) which is the seat of the Diocese of Bandung.

Facilities
Classroom
Library
Canteen
Indoor Court
Basketball Court
Volleyball Court
Futsal Court
Laboratory
Auditoriums
Playground

References

Schools in Indonesia
Educational institutions established in 1905
Schools in Bandung
1905 establishments in the Dutch East Indies